Federico Russo may refer to:

 Federico Russo (presenter) (born 1980), Italian radio and television presenter
 Federico Russo (actor) (born 1997), Italian actor